Viper is a steel roller coaster located at Six Flags Darien Lake amusement park in Darien, New York, United States. Built by the newly-formed Arrow Huss, the ride opened in 1982 as the first roller coaster in the world to feature five inversions, surpassing Carolina Cyclone at Carowinds which featured four. Viper retained the inversions record until Vortex opened at Kings Island in 1987.

History
On November 17, 1981, Darien Lake announced that they would be building a new roller coaster for the 1982 season. It would be built by Arrow Huss and be the park's first major roller coaster. This one would also be the first roller coaster to take guests upside down five times. The new coaster was set to be named Thunderbolt Express, but this was changed to Viper.

Viper officially opened to guests on May 29, 1982. The track was originally all black, but it was repainted to a green track with black supports when Six Flags took over Darien Lake in 1999. In 2010, Darien Lake repainted the Viper all black again. 

The trains were once color coded blue, red and yellow. In 2013, the trains were given green vinyl wraps. One train had an orange stripe and another had a blue stripe. The third train was disassembled and used for spare parts for the two other trains. Currently, Viper only runs with one train with the two trains switching out every year.

Ride experience

Inversions

Layout
Next, the train enters a batwing element (also known as boomerang on Arrow Dynamics coasters), which is a heart-shaped series of two inversions, consisting of a reverse sidewinder followed by a sidewinder. By the time the train exits those, the track has turned 180° and is now headed back towards the station. After a left turn the train encounters the mid-ride brakes. Next, the track makes a 180° turn to the right and enters two consecutive corkscrews. Then its off into a 540° helix where the track goes through a 110' tunnel, then finally returns to the station.

Points of interest: The entrance queue goes under portions of the track, allowing an underneath point of view for observers. During the event FrightFest, there is an attraction where an old mini golf course used to stand underneath the track as well, now only accessible during FrightFest. Also, there is an on-ride camera that takes pictures of the guests and photos can be purchased at a shack near the ride's exit. In the past, this camera was mounted beside the end of the second corkscrew. For the 2017 season, the camera was positioned at the top of the entrance to the tunnel.

References

External links

Six Flags Darien Lake
Roller coasters in New York (state)
Roller coasters introduced in 1982
Roller coasters operated by Six Flags
1982 establishments in New York (state)